This article is an incomplete list of wars and conflicts involving Austria.

Margraviate of Austria (976–1156)

Duchy of Austria (1156–1453)

Archduchy of Austria (1453–1804)

Austrian Empire (1804–1867)

Austro-Hungarian Empire (1867–1918)

Republic of German-Austria (1918–1919)

First Austrian Republic (1919–1934)

Federal State of Austria (1934–1938)

See also
History of Austria
Austrian Armed Forces
Military history of Austria
:Category:Wars involving the Holy Roman Empire
Archduke Franz Ferdinand of Austria
Adolf Hitler

References

Wars
Austria
Wars